Broken Promise is a 2009 drama film directed by Jiří Chlumský and starring Samuel Spišák, Ondřej Vetchý, and Zuzana Porubjaková. The film was Slovakia's submission to the 82nd Academy Awards in the Best Foreign Language Film category. It won the main prize at the 2009 Los Angeles Jewish Film Festival. Broken Promise received nine nominations at the 2010 Sun in a Net Awards but succeeded in winning just one, awarded to Michal Novinski for the film's music.

Plot
Martin Friedmann grows up in a large Jewish family in the Slovak town of Bánovce nad Bebravou. His life is turned upside down with the outbreak of World War II, Slovakia's alignment with the Nazis, and the subsequent persecution of Jews. Motivated by a letter from a friend, he voluntarily goes to the labor camp in Sereď, where he manages to avoid being deported to a death camp due to his ability to play football. One day, he escapes the camp and returns to his hometown, only to discover that his family has been removed.

After returning to the camp, Martin catches pneumonia, and the doctor sends him to a sanatorium. In order not to have to return to the camp, he works as a laborer in a monastery.

With the end of the war approaching, Martin leaves the monastery, contacts the resistance in Poprad, and joins the partisans under the name Martin Petrášek. He actively participates in the Slovak National Uprising, during which he works in Zvolen. After the defeat of the rebellion, he and the other partisans take refuge in the mountains, where they fight and manage to hold out until the end of the war.

In the end, Martin returns to his birthplace, where he finds only memories and family heirlooms.

Cast and characters
 Samuel Spišák as Martin Friedmann
 Ondřej Vetchý as Friedmann senior
 Zuzana Porubjaková as Eva

See also
 List of Slovak submissions for the Academy Award for Best Foreign Language Film
 List of submissions to the 82nd Academy Awards for Best Foreign Language Film

References

External links
 
 Broken Promise at Eurochannel

2000s war drama films
Czech war drama films
Slovak war drama films
2009 drama films
2009 films
Czech World War II films
Slovak World War II films
American World War II films
World War II films based on actual events
2000s American films
2000s Czech films